= Haidensee =

- Location within Austria
- Location: Carinthia, Austria
- Coordinates: 46°43′18″N 14°14′40″E
- Type: lake

Haidensee is a lake of Carinthia, Austria.
